Phlogiellus xingping is a small species of terrestrial tarantula in the genus Phlogiellus first documented in 2008.  It is quite peaceful and often stays in its own burrow. It is covered with dense hair, less on the carapace. It is only found in Hong Kong.

References

Theraphosidae
Spiders of Asia
Spiders described in 2008